The women's 48 kg competition of the weightlifting events at the 2011 Pan American Games in Guadalajara, Mexico, was held on October 23 at the Weightlifting Forum.  The defending champion was Carolina Valencia from Mexico.

Each lifter performed in both the snatch and clean and jerk lifts, with the final score being the sum of the lifter's best result in each. The athlete received three attempts in each of the two lifts; the score for the lift was the heaviest weight successfully lifted. This weightlifting event was the lightest women's event at the weightlifting competition, limiting competitors to a maximum of 48 kilograms of body mass.

Schedule
All times are Central Standard Time (UTC-6).

Results
9 athletes from 8 countries took part.

References

External links
Weightlifting schedule

Weightlifting at the 2011 Pan American Games
Pan
Wei